Congregation Or Chadash (Hebrew for "New Light") was a Reform LGBT-oriented congregation in the Edgewater neighborhood of Chicago, Illinois. It was founded in 1975 as a gay support group for Jews, and was holding religious services by 1976. It moved into its first building, a former Unitarian church on West Barry Avenue in 1977, and hired its first permanent rabbi, Suzanne Griffel, in 1997.

Griffel was succeeded as rabbi by Larry Edwards, and Or Chadash moved to its current location, which it shares with another synagogue and a Jewish day school, in 2003. In October 2010, Or Chadash was thought to be one of the two synagogues targeted in the 2010 cargo planes bomb plot.

, Cindy Enger is rabbi and the congregation's hazzan is Judith Golden.

Early history
Or Chadash was founded in Chicago in 1975 as a gay support group for Jews. The organization was initially called simply "The Jewish Group". It held its first religious services in January 1976, and adopted its current name in April of that year.  The congregation remains geared to needs of LGBT Jews.

According to J. Gordon Melton, at the time of its founding there were four other gay synagogues in the United States, in Manhattan, Miami, Los Angeles and Berkeley, California.  Or Chadash and the other gay congregations faced significant opposition from others in the Jewish community, which had, Melton writes, "traditionally abhorred homosexuality because of the admonition to be fruitful and multiply (Gen. 1:28), and the unequivocal denunciation of homosexuality in the Torah (Lev. 20:13)".

Rabbis
Originally established as a member-led congregation, Or Chadash briefly had a rabbi for a few months in the 1980s. The rabbi had asked if he could temporarily lead the group, but was not replaced after he left.  In 1997, the congregation hired its first permanent rabbi, the 35-year-old Suzanne Griffel. She had previously been director and rabbi of a Hillel branch at the University of Chicago.  It was the first time a Chicago gay/lesbian synagogue had hired a rabbi, and the first time any American mostly gay synagogue had hired a straight rabbi. At the time, the synagogue had 120 members.

Griffel was succeeded as rabbi of Or Chadash by Laurence "Larry" Edwards, who was ordained at Hebrew Union College-Jewish Institute of Religion in New York. Prior to joining Congregation Or Chadash, Edwards served for 22 years as a director of Hillel branches at Dartmouth College and Cornell University.

Buildings
In 1977, the congregation moved into the Second Unitarian Church building at 656 West Barry Avenue, from which it operated for over two decades. The congregation moved in 2003 to 5959 North Sheridan Road, a building which it shares with another synagogue, the Emanuel Congregation, and Chicago Jewish Day School, a school for children from kindergarten through 8th grade.

Events since 2005
Or Chadash was inducted into the Chicago Gay and Lesbian Hall of Fame in 2006.

On October 10, 2010, Or Chadash was notified that its synagogue was one of the addresses on the packages in the 2010 cargo plane bomb plot. Rabbi Edwards said "We're rather puzzled at how a little congregation like ours would get on the radar as a target for somebody". Because Or Chadash is so small, Edwards surmised that it had been targeted at random, or because it is mostly gay. The website of Emanuel Congregation, which shares space with Congregation Or Chadash, was recently visited 83 times in one day by someone in Egypt, according to Emanuel's website administrator. However, intelligence officials are reported to believe that the synagogues were not actual targets and that the bombs were intended to detonate while still on board airplanes. According to CNN.com, on November 3, Or Chadash co-president Lilli Kornblum "said that despite earlier reports, an FBI agent informed her that her synagogue was not one of the intended destinations in the foiled bomb plot that originated in Yemen."

Later reports indicated that one of the bombs had been addressed to Or Chadash'''s former location on West Barry, and the other to an inactive Orthodox synagogue, also in Chicago. Investigators believed that the bombers "...used an outdated directory of Chicago Jewish institutions that is still available on the Internet." Robert Pape, a University of Chicago professor who has studied terrorist groups, believed that the synagogues were a backup plan, had the bombs not detonated mid-flight.  The packages would have been delivered on the Jewish Sabbath.

, Or Chadash is affiliated with the Union for Reform Judaism and the World Congress of Gay, Lesbian, Bisexual, and Transgender Jews. Edwards is the rabbi, and the Cantor is Judith Golden.

Merger
By mid-2016, Or Chadash membership had declined to about 60 members "basically because we got what we wanted. … There's no longer a need for a separate congregation," Or Chadash co-president Lilli Kornblum told a local newspaper. On June 24, 2016, Or Chadash'' held its final service as an independent congregation, and after considering a merger with three Chicago Reform institutions, merged with the Am Keshet LGBT group at Temple Sholom in Chicago.

Notes

References

External links
Congregation Or Chadash website

LGBT culture in Chicago
LGBT synagogues in the United States
Reform synagogues in Illinois
Jewish organizations established in 1975
Synagogues in Chicago